EuroCity Express, or short ECE, is a category of Eurocity train marketed by Deutsche Bahn that runs on two routes as of 2021. It was created to classify a newly introduced international high speed train service in a higher category - equivalent to the Intercity-Express - than the existing Eurocity, which is equivalent to the "second tier" domestic Intercity.

History 

The train category was newly created with the timetable change on December 10, 2017, because the Frankfurt-Milan connection, operated with an ETR 610 of the Swiss Federal Railways, offers ICE-like travel times and comfort, according to Deutsche Bahn. Because the train would have been classified as an EC only in the second highest train category, the new EuroCity-Express category was created in line with the ICE, which is equivalent to the ICE in terms of fares.

With the change of timetable on December 13, 2020, ECE trains operated by ETR 610 "Astoro" began service on the partially new electrified line between Munich and Zurich. In the medium term, the German Federal Minister of Transport, Andreas Scheuer, is aiming to integrate these connections into his concept of a "Trans-Europ-Express 2.0".

Services

Frankfurt–Milano 
The first ECE line, introduced in 2017, runs from Frankfurt Central Station via Mannheim, Karlsruhe, Freiburg and Basel to Milano Centrale station. The train is only operated as ECE in Germany (Frankfurt (Main) Hbf to Basel Bad Bf); in Switzerland and Italy, the train type is EuroCity. In terms of the timetable, this is an extension of the EC Milano Centrale-Basel SBB to the north.

Munich–Zurich 
The service between Munich and Zurich was launched with the timetable change in December 2020. In cooperation with SBB and ÖBB, six pairs of ECE trains are offered daily. The line's launch was made possible by the electrification of the Geltendorf-Lindau section of the Buchloe–Lindau railway. Previously, four EuroCity train pairs ran daily on the connection, three of them via Memmingen, as is the case now with the ECE, and one via Kempten. The latter route was eliminated with the changeover, as the line via Kempten has not been electrified. The section to Basel SBB is discontinued as well. While the former ECs went to the terminus station on the island of Lindau, the ECEs serve the long-distance through-station Lindau-Reutin solely.

Equipment 
SBB's Alstom ETR 610 ("Astoro") are used: SBB RABe 503 022 was given a trinational design for the inauguration of the first ECE connection and was given the name Johann Wolfgang von Goethe at Basel SBB station on November 17, 2017. SBB's Alstom ETR 610 trains with tilting technology are also in operation on the route between Munich and Zurich.

Rate system 
In Germany, the train is priced at the ICE fare. In Italy, on the other hand, it is sold as a regular EuroCity. In Switzerland, there is in general no differentiation in fares according to train category. In cross-border traffic to Italy, a global fare also applies, with a seat reservation included in the fare.

References 

 
Deutsche Bahn
Rail transport in Europe
Rail transport brands
High-speed trains of Germany
High-speed rail in Germany
High-speed rail in Switzerland
High-speed trains of Austria
EuroCity
Transport and the European Union